Austin Block (born October 10, 1989) is an American professional ice hockey center and forward. He is currently an unrestricted free agent, having last played for the Manchester Monarchs in the ECHL.

Early and personal life
Block was born in Denver, Colorado, but grew up in Thousand Oaks, California, and is Jewish. His parents are Randy Block (who played football at Northern Arizona) and Shellie Jernigan.

Playing career
Block played with the Fairbanks Ice Dogs of the North American Hockey League for two seasons, where he had 100 points (42 goals, 58 assists) in 110 games, as he led the league in points (76) in 2008–09, as he was named the league’s top forward as NAHL Forward of the Year. He was also named to the NAHL All-West Division Team and NAHL First All-Star Team.

He then played for the University of New Hampshire Wildcats men's hockey program.  He played four seasons at UNH, playing 136 games and putting up 25 goals and 25 assists for 50 points.

On July 22, 2013, HIFK of the Finnish Liiga announced they had signed Block after a two-week tryout in June 2013. Block made his Liiga debut playing with HIFK during the 2013–14 Liiga season. On September 20, 2013 Block was loaned from HIFK to Mestis club, HCK until he moved to Swedish HockeyAllsvenskan club Karlskrona HK.

In the following 2014–15 season, Block moved to the Slovak Extraliga with HC ’05 Banská Bystrica, appearing in 21 games for 15 points before returning to North American to play in the ECHL with the Bakersfield Condors.

On July 31, 2015, Block signed a one-year contract to remain in the ECHL with the Manchester Monarchs.

On February 12, 2016, the Orlando Solar Bears, ECHL affiliate of the NHL’s Toronto Maple Leafs and AHL’s Toronto Marlies, announced they had acquired Block from the Monarchs in exchange for future considerations. He spent parts of two seasons with the Solar Bears.

Block was traded to the Cincinnati Cyclones on October 2, 2017, just prior to the 2017–18 season. He made just two appearances with the Cyclones before suffering a season-ending injury.

As a free agent, Block continued his ECHL career by agreeing to contract with the Worcester Railers for the 2018–19 season on October 7, 2018. He contributed with 7 assists through 25 games with the Railers, before he was traded to former club the Manchester Monarchs on December 30, 2018.

Career statistics

Awards and honors

See also
List of select Jewish ice hockey players

References

External links

1989 births
Jewish American sportspeople
Jewish ice hockey players
American men's ice hockey centers
Bakersfield Condors (1998–2015) players
Cincinnati Cyclones (ECHL) players
Fairbanks Ice Dogs players
HC '05 Banská Bystrica players
HIFK (ice hockey) players
Ice hockey players from California
Karlskrona HK players
Living people
Manchester Monarchs (ECHL) players
Mestis players
New Hampshire Wildcats men's ice hockey players
Orlando Solar Bears (ECHL) players
People from Thousand Oaks, California
Sportspeople from Ventura County, California
Ice hockey people from Denver
Worcester Railers players
21st-century American Jews
American expatriate ice hockey players in Slovakia
American expatriate ice hockey players in Finland
American expatriate ice hockey players in Sweden